Higrevirus is a genus of viruses. Plants serve as natural hosts. There is currently only one species in this genus: the type species Hibiscus green spot virus 2.

Structure
Viruses in Higrevirus are non-enveloped, with bacilliform geometries. These viruses are about 30 nm wide and 50 nm long. Genomes are linear and segmented, tripartite, around 38.43.23.1kb in length.

Life cycle
Viral replication is cytoplasmic. Entry into the host cell is achieved by penetration into the host cell. Replication follows the positive stranded RNA virus replication model. Positive stranded RNA virus transcription is the method of transcription. Plants serve as the natural host.

References

External links
 Viralzone: Higrevirus
 ICTV

Positive-sense single-stranded RNA viruses
Monotypic genera
Virus genera
Riboviria